Sloboda is a rural locality (a village) in Kichmegnskoye Rural Settlement, Kichmengsko-Gorodetsky District, Vologda Oblast, Russia. The population was 309 as of 2002. There are 7 streets.

Geography 
Sloboda is located 7 km northeast of Kichmengsky Gorodok (the district's administrative centre) by road. Lobanovo is the nearest rural locality.

References 

Rural localities in Kichmengsko-Gorodetsky District